The Distinguished Service Order (DSO) is a military decoration of the United Kingdom, as well as formerly of other parts of the Commonwealth, awarded for meritorious or distinguished service by officers of the armed forces during wartime, typically in actual combat. Since 1993 it has been awarded specifically for 'highly successful command and leadership during active operations', with all ranks being eligible.

History 

Instituted on 6 September 1886 by Queen Victoria in a royal warrant published in The London Gazette on 9 November, the first DSOs awarded were dated 25 November 1886.

The order was established to reward individual instances of meritorious or distinguished service in war. It was a military order, until recently for officers only and typically awarded to officers ranked major (or equivalent) or higher, with awards to ranks below this usually for a high degree of gallantry, just short of deserving the Victoria Cross.

Whilst normally given for service under fire or under conditions equivalent to service in actual combat with the enemy, a number of awards made between 1914 and 1916 were under circumstances not under fire, often to staff officers, causing resentment among front-line officers. After 1 January 1917, commanders in the field were instructed to recommend this award only for those serving under fire.

From 1916, ribbon bars could be authorised for subsequent awards of the DSO, worn on the ribbon of the original award.

In 1942, the award was extended to officers of the Merchant Navy who had performed acts of gallantry whilst under enemy attack. A requirement that the order could be given only to someone mentioned in despatches was removed in 1943.

Modern era 
Since 1993, reflecting the review of the British honours system which recommended removing distinctions of rank in respect of operational awards, the DSO has been open to all ranks, with the award criteria redefined as 'highly successful command and leadership during active operations'. At the same time, the Conspicuous Gallantry Cross was introduced as the second-highest award for gallantry. Despite some very fierce campaigns in Iraq and Afghanistan, the DSO has yet to be awarded to a non-commissioned rank.

The DSO had also been awarded by Commonwealth countries but by the 1990s most, including Canada, Australia and New Zealand, were establishing their own honours systems and no longer recommended British honours.

Nomenclature 
Recipients of the order are officially known as Companions of the Distinguished Service Order, and are entitled to use the post-nominal letters "DSO". All awards are announced in The London Gazette.

Description 
It is manufactured by Messrs Garrard & Co, the Crown Jewellers.
 In the centre of the obverse, within a green enamelled laurel wreath, is the imperial crown in gold upon a red enamelled background. The reverse has the royal cypher of the reigning monarch in gold within a similar wreath and background.
 A ring at the top of the medal attaches to a ring at the bottom of a gilt suspension bar, ornamented with laurel. Since 1938 the year of award engraved on the back of the suspension bar. At the top of the ribbon is a second gilt bar ornamented with laurel.
 The medals are issued unnamed but some recipients have had their names engraved on the reverse of the suspension bar.
 The bar for an additional award is plain gold with an Imperial Crown in the centre. Since about 1938, the year of the award has been engraved on the back of the bar. A rosette is worn on the ribbon in undress uniform to signify the award of each bar.

Recipients

Numbers awarded
From 1918 to 2017 the insignia of the Distinguished Service Order has been awarded approximately 16,935 times, in addition to 1,910 bars. The figures to 1979 are laid out in the table below, the dates reflecting the relevant entries in the London Gazette:

In addition, between 1980 and 2017 approximately 90 DSOs have been earned, including awards for the Falklands and the wars in the Gulf, Iraq and Afghanistan, in addition to three second-award bars.

The above figures include awards to the Commonwealth. In all, 1,220 DSOs have gone to Canadians, plus 119 first bars and 20 second bars. From 1901 to 1972, when the last Australian to receive the DSO was announced, 1,018 awards were made to Australians, plus 70 first bars and one second bar. The DSO was awarded to over 300 New Zealanders during the two World Wars.

Honorary awards to members of allied foreign forces include at least 1,329 for World War I, with further awards for World War II.

Notable recipients 

The following received the DSO and three bars (i.e., were awarded the DSO four times):
 Archibald Walter Buckle, rose from naval rating in the Royal Naval Volunteer Reserve to command the Anson Battalion of the Royal Naval Division during the First World War
 William Denman Croft, First World War army officer
 William Robert Aufrere Dawson, Queen's Own Royal West Kent Regiment during the First World War, wounded nine times and mentioned in despatches four times
 Basil Embry, Second World War Royal Air Force officer
 Bernard Freyberg, also awarded the Victoria Cross
 Edward Albert Gibbs, Second World War destroyer captain
 Arnold Jackson, First World War British Army officer and 1500 metres Olympic gold medal winner in 1912
 Douglas Kendrew, served as a brigade commander in Italy, Greece and the Middle East between 1944 and 1946. Subsequently appointed Governor of Western Australia.
 Robert Sinclair Knox, First World War British Army officer
 Frederick William Lumsden, British First World War Royal Marines officer, also awarded the Victoria Cross
 Paddy Mayne, Special Air Service commander in the Second World War and Irish rugby player
 Sir Richard George Onslow, Second World War destroyer captain and later admiral
 Alastair Pearson, a British Army officer who received his four awards within the space of two years during the Second World War
 James Brian Tait, RAF pilot also awarded the DFC and bar, completed 101 bombing missions in the Second World War
 Frederic John Walker, Second World War British Navy captain and U-boat hunter
 Edward Allan Wood, First World War army officer

See also 
 Military awards and decorations of the United Kingdom
 British and Commonwealth orders and decorations

References

External links 

 UK Cabinet Office, Honours System: Orders of Chivalry

 Search recommendations for the DSO on the UK National Archives' website

Awards established in 1886
1886 establishments in the United Kingdom
Courage awards
Military awards and decorations of the United Kingdom